The 2011 Kentucky Wildcats football team represented the University of Kentucky in the college football season of 2011–2012. The team, led by second-year head coach Joker Phillips, played their home games at Commonwealth Stadium, now known as Kroger Field, in Lexington, Kentucky, and competed in the Eastern Division of the Southeastern Conference (SEC).

While the Wildcats ended the season at 5–7 and missed out what would have been their sixth consecutive bowl appearance, they finished on a high. The Wildcats' season-ending 10–7 victory over Tennessee, their first over the Volunteers since 1984, ended what was then the longest current losing streak against an annual opponent in FBS at 26.

Schedule

Game summaries

Western Kentucky

Central Michigan

Louisville

Florida

LSU

South Carolina

Jacksonville State

Mississippi State

Ole Miss

Vanderbilt

Georgia

Tennessee

Statistics

Team

Scores by quarter

Offense

Rushing

Passing

Receiving

Defense

Special teams

Starters per game
Offense

Defense

Personnel

Coaching staff

Depth chart

Roster

Signees and commitments

2011 class

2012 class

References

Kentucky
Kentucky Wildcats football seasons
Kentucky Wildcats football